Dinçer is a surname of Turkish origin and may refer to:

 Haluk Dinçer (born 1962), Turkish businessman
 Kemal Dinçer (born 1963), Turkish basketball player
 Ömer Dinçer (born 1956), Turkish politician
 Semra Dinçer (1965-2021), Turkish actress
 Suzan Sabancı Dinçer (born 1965), Turkish businesswoman

Turkish-language surnames